Larpent may refer to:

George Larpent (1786-1855), British businessman and politician
John Larpent
Larpent Baronets
Larpent, Victoria, a locality in Australia